Lasius mexicanus is a species of ant belonging to the genus Lasius, formerly a part of the genus (now a subgenus) Acanthomyops. Described in 1914 by William Morton Wheeler, the species is native to Mexico.

References

mexicanus
Insects described in 1914
Hymenoptera of North America
Endemic insects of Mexico